Magyarország Szépe (Miss World Hungary) is a national Beauty pageant for Miss World pageant. The pageant under the management of The Magyarország Szépe Kft. (Beauty of Hungary Ltd.) This pageant is not related to Miss Universe Hungary or Miss International Hungary contests.

History
The first Hungary representative to Miss World in under Miss Hungary pageant began in 1985 to 1995. Between 1996 and 2005 the Miss Hungary for Miss World was organized by Mr. Ádám Fásy. Since 2006 the national franchise holder of Miss World in Hungary was taken by Magyarország Szépe Kft. or called as Beauty of Hungary Ltd. During that years, the one of the winners of A Szépségkirálynő will compete at the Miss World pageant. Since 2015 the pageant names as Magyarország Szépe contest the titleholders might crown as Miss World Hungary, Miss Earth Hungary and Top Model of the world Hungary.

Pageant system
The organizers of the pageant accept applications that fulfil the requirements of the Miss World, Miss Universe and Miss Earth pageants. In 2008 and 2009 castings were organized in the headquarters of the RTL Klub TV-channel. The channel was the co-organizer and promoter of the event. About 2000 women applied for the 3 titles, but only 24 were invited to the preparation camp where the contestants were prepared for the final. During preparation a jury decided that 3 of the 24 contestants would be eliminated, and only 21 girls got into the final show which was telecasted live in Hungary.

Titleholders
Color key

Miss World Hungary

Miss Earth Hungary
Magyarország Szépe also sends delegate to the Miss Earth pageant. The official license also manages in under Miss World Hungary Team in Budapest since 2008. Third title of Miss World Hungary may compete at the pageant. Begin in 2015 second place automatically crowns as Miss Earth Hungary.

Miss Supranational
Magyarorszag Szepe also sends delegate to the Miss Supranational pageant. The official license also manages in under Miss World Hungary Team in Budapest since 2010. Runner-up or appoint candidate of Miss World Hungary may compete at the pageant.

Statistics on Miss World
As of 2009

Crossovers

See also
Other Hungarian beauty pageants are:

 Miss Universe Hungary
 Miss Hungary
 the Belle of the Anna-ball

References

External links 
 Miss World Hungary official homepage

Beauty pageants in Hungary
Hungary
Hungary
Hungarian awards